Petrine Caroline Georgine Fredstrup (2 June 1827- 24 September 1881), was a Danish ballet dancer.  She was regarded as one of the elite members of the Royal Danish Ballet from 1845 to 1871. She was also a respected ballet instructor.

References 

1827 births
1881 deaths
Danish ballerinas
19th-century Danish ballet dancers
Royal Danish Ballet dancers
Ballet teachers